The 2021 Wimbledon Championships was a Grand Slam tennis tournament that took place at the All England Lawn Tennis and Croquet Club in Wimbledon, London, United Kingdom. Novak Djokovic successfully defended his gentlemen's singles title to claim his record-equalling 20th major title, defeating Matteo Berrettini in the final. Simona Halep was the defending ladies' singles champion from 2019, but she withdrew from the competition due to a calf injury. The Ladies' Singles title was won by Ashleigh Barty, who defeated Karolína Plíšková in the final.

Following the cancellation of the 2020 tournament because of the COVID-19 pandemic, the main tournament began on Monday 28 June 2021 and finished on Sunday 11 July 2021. The 2021 Championships were the 134th edition, the 127th staging of the ladies' singles Championship event, the 53rd in the Open Era and the third Grand Slam tournament of the year. It was played on grass courts and is part of the ATP Tour, the WTA Tour, the ITF Junior Circuit and the ITF Wheelchair Tennis Tour. The tournament was organised by the All England Lawn Tennis Club and International Tennis Federation.

This was the final edition of Wimbledon to have no matches scheduled on "Middle Sunday."

Tournament 

The 2021 Wimbledon Championships were the 134th edition of the tournament and were held at the All England Lawn Tennis and Croquet Club in London. The Championships were initially held at 50% capacity, before increasing to full capacity in the second week. Spectators were required to have tested negative for COVID-19 within 48 hours prior to attendance or to be fully vaccinated.

The tournament was run by the International Tennis Federation (ITF) and is included in the 2021 ATP Tour and the 2021 WTA Tour calendars under the Grand Slam category. The tournament consisted of men's (singles and doubles), women's (singles and doubles), mixed doubles, boys (under 18 – singles and doubles) and girls (under 18 – singles and doubles), which were also a part of the Grade A category of tournaments for under 18, and singles & doubles events for men's and women's wheelchair tennis players as part of the Uniqlo Tour under the Grand Slam category, also hosting singles and doubles events for wheelchair quad tennis for the first time.

The tournament was played on grass courts; main draw matches were played at the All England Lawn Tennis and Croquet Club, Wimbledon. Qualifying matches were played, from Monday 21 June to Friday 25 June 2021, at the Bank of England Sports Ground, Roehampton. The Tennis Sub-Committee met to decide wild card entries on 14 June.

The gentlemen's seedings formula used since 2002 was not used. Seedings used the standard system based on ATP rankings.

No invitation doubles events were held during this edition of the tournament.

Singles players 
Gentlemen's singles

Ladies' singles

Events

Gentlemen's singles

  Novak Djokovic def.  Matteo Berrettini, 6–7(4–7), 6–4, 6–4, 6–3

Ladies' singles

  Ashleigh Barty def.  Karolína Plíšková, 6–3, 6–7(4–7), 6–3

Gentlemen's doubles

  Nikola Mektić /  Mate Pavić def.  Marcel Granollers /  Horacio Zeballos, 6–4, 7–6(7–5), 2–6, 7–5

Ladies' doubles

  Hsieh Su-wei /  Elise Mertens def.  Veronika Kudermetova /  Elena Vesnina, 3–6, 7–5, 9–7

Mixed doubles

  Neal Skupski /  Desirae Krawczyk def.  Joe Salisbury /  Harriet Dart, 6–2, 7–6(7–1)

Wheelchair gentlemen's singles

  Joachim Gérard def.  Gordon Reid, 6–2, 7–6(7–2)

Wheelchair ladies' singles

  Diede de Groot def.  Kgothatso Montjane, 6–2, 6–2

Wheelchair quad singles

  Dylan Alcott def.  Sam Schröder, 6–2, 6–2

Wheelchair gentlemen's doubles

  Alfie Hewett /  Gordon Reid def.  Tom Egberink /  Joachim Gérard, 7–5, 6–2

Wheelchair ladies' doubles

  Yui Kamiji /  Jordanne Whiley def.  Kgothatso Montjane /  Lucy Shuker, 6–0, 7–6(7–0)

Wheelchair quad doubles 

  Andy Lapthorne /  David Wagner def.  Dylan Alcott /  Sam Schröder, 6–1, 3–6, 6–4

Boys' singles

  Samir Banerjee def.  Victor Lilov, 7–5, 6–3

Girls' singles

  Ane Mintegi del Olmo def.  Nastasja Schunk, 2–6, 6–4, 6–1

Boys' doubles

  Edas Butvilas /  Alejandro Manzanera Pertusa def.  Daniel Rincón /  Abedallah Shelbayh, 6–3, 6–4

Girls' doubles

  Kristina Dmitruk /  Diana Shnaider def.  Sofia Costoulas /  Laura Hietaranta, 6–1, 6–2

Point distribution and prize money 
As a Grand Slam tournament, the points for Wimbledon are the highest of all ATP and WTA tournaments. These points determine the world ATP and WTA rankings for men's and women's competition, respectively. Because of the smaller draws and the pandemic, all men's and women's doubles players that made it past the first round received half the points of their singles counterparts, a change from previous years where singles and doubles players received the same number of points in all but the first two rounds. In both singles and doubles, women received slightly higher point totals compared to their male counterparts at each round of the tournament, except for the first and last. Points and rankings for the wheelchair events fall under the jurisdiction of the ITF Wheelchair Tennis Tour, which also places Grand Slams as the highest classification.

The ATP and WTA rankings were both altered in 2020, owing to the COVID-19 pandemic. Both rankings were frozen on 16 March 2020 upon the suspension of both tours, and as a result the traditional 52-week ranking system was extended to cover the period from March 2019 to March 2021 with a player's best 18 results in that time period factoring into their point totals.

For the ATP, in March 2021, the ATP extended the "best of" logic to their rankings through to the week of 9 August 2021. Players will count either their 2021 points or 50% of their 2019 points, whichever is greater.
For the WTA, their 2019 points will drop off at 2021 edition.

Point distribution 
Below is the tables with the point distribution for each phase of the tournament.

Senior points

Wheelchair points

Junior points

Prize money
The Wimbledon Championships total prize money for 2021 decreased by 7.85% to £35,016,000. However, the prize money figure does not include the substantial investment required to provide quality accommodation for the players, or to create a minimised risk environment and comprehensive testing programme.

*per team

References

External links 
 

 
2021 ATP Tour
2021 WTA Tour
2021 in tennis
2021 in English sport
2021 sports events in London
June 2021 sports events in the United Kingdom
July 2021 sports events in the United Kingdom